The following active airports serve the area around London, Ontario, Canada:

See also 

 List of airports in the Bala, Ontario area
 List of airports in the Bracebridge area
 List of airports in the Fergus area
 List of airports in the Ottawa area
 List of airports in the Parry Sound area
 List of airports in the Port Carling area
 List of airports in the Sault Ste. Marie, Ontario area
 List of airports in the Thunder Bay area
 List of airports in the Greater Toronto Area

References 

 
London, Ontario
Airports
London, Ontario
Airports